P53-responsive gene 1 is a protein that in humans is encoded by the PRG1 gene.

References

Further reading